Soewondo Air Force Base is currently the military airbase of Medan, North Sumatra, Indonesia.  Before 2013, this airport served commercial flights, and was known as Polonia International Airport  which was the principal airport that served Medan, North Sumatra, Indonesia, about 2 km from the downtown, and used to serve flights to several Indonesian and Malaysian cities, along with a flight to Singapore and Thailand. Previous international flights had been opened to Hong Kong, Taipei, Amsterdam, Phuket, Chennai, Johor Bahru, Malacca and Ipoh.

At the end of its service as civil airport, Polonia was the fourth largest airport in Indonesia after Soekarno–Hatta, Juanda, and I Gusti Ngurah Rai, in terms of passenger numbers. Passenger service charges for each departed through domestic terminal was IDR 35,000 ($4.1) and IDR 75,000 ($8.8) for international terminal.

All flights and services from this airport shifted to Kuala Namu International Airport on 25 July 2013. Following the airport's opening, Polonia's ICAO code is changed from WIMM to WIMK, since WIMM is assigned for Kuala Namu.

Now as Soewondo Air Force Base, the airport belongs to the Indonesian Air Force. It hosts the Western Surveillance Wing including eight CN-235 tactical surveillance airplanes.

History

The airport's former name is taken from the plantation area owned by a Pole, Baron Ludwik Michalski in which it is situated. Polonia originates from the Latin name of the country of Poland. Michalski was a veteran of 1863 January Uprising against the Imperial Russian rule, after which he fled to Switzerland. In 1872, Michalski obtained a concession from the Dutch East Indies administration for a tobacco plantation in Medan. He named the plantation after the country of his birth, which at that time was not an independent state.

In 1879 the concession was handed over to Deli Maatschappij (Deli MIJ) or NV Deli Maskapai. In 1924, Dutch KLM test pilot N. J. Thomassen à Thuessink van der Hoop planned to fly on a Fokker F.VII in a pioneering flight from the Netherlands. Therefore, Deli MIJ who controlled that piece of land handed it over for the land to become the first airstrip in Medan.

By the time the news had arrived, it was too late to prepare a proper landing strip at Polonia. As a result, van der Hoop, together with Lieutenant H van Weerden Poelman of the Army Aviation Department and KLM flight engineer P. A. van den Broeke landed on a horse-racing track called Deli Renvereeniging and were greeted by the Sultan of Deli, Sulaiman Syaiful Alamsyah.

After this first landing, the Assistant Resident of Eastern Sumatra C.S. Van Kempen urged the Netherlands East Indies administration in Batavia to allocate the necessary funding to finish the airport at Polonia. In 1928 the airport was officially opened which was marked with the landing of six aircraft owned by KNILM, (not a subsidiary of KLM) on a temporary hardened dirt runway. From 1930, KLM and KNILM started expanding its network to Medan. It was only in 1936 that the airport's 600-metre permanent runway was finished.

In 1975, according to a joint decree issued by the Department of Defence and Security, Department of Transportation, and Department of Finance, the airport was jointly managed between the Indonesian Air Force and the Civil Aviation. From 1985, according to the Government Regulation No. 30-year 1975, the management became the responsibility of Perum Angkasa Pura which subsequently became PT Angkasa Pura II (Persero) after 1 January 1994.

Polonia Airport is now closed to commercial aviation and replaced by Kualanamu International Airport.

The airport's last arrival on 24 July 2013 was AirAsia from Bandung at 23:50 WIB. The airport was closed right after the last landing. The last activities in the airport were the ferry flights after official closing ceremony at 00:00 WIB and the cease of transportation at 00:30 WIB. The first ferry flight, a Garuda Indonesia aircraft, received a water salute before taking off from Polonia Airport and after landing at Kualanamu Airport. It carried the Minister of State-owned Enterprise Dahlan Iskan along with the Deputy Minister of Transportation and other officials.

After the ferry flights were completed, all of the Polonia Airport's activity officially shifted to Kualanamu International Airport. Polonia Airport is now used as an air force base.

Facilities

The airport is located on 144 hectares land area. There is a single asphalt runway (05/23) which is 3000 m long and 45 m wide, but has only 2,900 m of usable length. There is no run-off space beyond the runway thresholds, and the airfield is surrounded by residential areas. It is often said that its location in a residential district, the wealthy Polonia area, is due to a superstition that the loud noises from aircraft drive away malevolent spirits.

Until recently, the airport consisted of an international and domestic terminal. A fire in the international arrivals area in 2006 caused damage to the airport, reducing the baggage reclaim area to a small section inside the terminal. On 2 December 2007, the domestic terminal was damaged by another fire. There were no injuries, and the separate international terminal was not affected.

The airport suffered from overcrowding, serving 7,5 million passengers annually in facilities designed to handle only 900,000 passengers. The other problems were no orderly parking space for taxis, too many porters and garbage control. These problems should be resolved by the construction of Kualanamu International Airport. Construction commenced 29 June 2006. It became Indonesia's 2nd-largest airport after Soekarno–Hatta International Airport and commenced operations on 25 July 2013.

Once, there was a dilemma of whether or not to upgrade Polonia International Airport, due to the delay of the finishing of the new Kualanamu International Airport. This dilemma made PT Angkasa Pura II pledge to fix access roads between Mustang Street and Imam Bonjol Street.

Traffics and statistics

Accidents and incidents
On 11 July 1979, a Fokker F28 of Garuda Indonesia Airways crashed into Mount Sibayak while on approach to Medan-Polonia airport. All 61 passengers and crew on board were killed.
On 4 April 1987, Garuda Indonesia Flight 035, crashed into power lines and a television aerial in bad weather as it attempted landing at Medan-Polonia. 22 of the 45 passengers and crew on board were killed.
On 18 June 1988, Vickers Viscount PK-MVG of Merpati Nusantara Airlines was damaged beyond economic repair when it suffered a hydraulic system failure and departed the runway.
On 26 September 1997, Garuda Indonesia Flight 152, an Airbus A300, crashed into woodlands 18 miles short of Medan-Polonia airport. All 234 passengers and crew on board were killed. Flight 152 is the worst aviation disaster in Indonesia history.
On 5 September 2005, Mandala Airlines Flight 091, crashed shortly after takeoff from Polonia. Of the 120 passengers and crew on board, 100 were killed. Another 49 people on the ground died as a result of the crash. It is the deadliest aviation accident involving the Boeing 737-200 series.
On 30 June 2015, an Indonesian Air Force Hercules C-130 crashed shortly after takeoff, killing all 121 on board and 22 people on the ground in one of Indonesia's worst Lockheed C-130 Hercules crashes.

See also

List of airports in Indonesia
Kuala Namu International Airport

References

External links
 
 

Defunct airports in Indonesia
Airports in Medan
Indonesian Air Force bases
1928 establishments in the Dutch East Indies
Airports established in 1928